This is a list of 19 regions of Italy and the 2 autonomous provinces of South Tyrol and Trentino by Human Development Index as of 2021.

See also
 List of countries by Human Development Index

References 

Economy of Italy by region
Human Development Index
Italy
Italy, HDI